Thomas Edward McCarthy (April 12, 1893 – December 28, 1959) was a professional ice hockey player who played two seasons in the National Hockey League for the Quebec Bulldogs and Hamilton Tigers. After several years as an amateur player with teams in New York, McCarthy joined the amateur Hamilton Tigers in 1918–19 and helped them win the Allan Cup as the best amateur team in Canada. He turned professional in 1919 when he joined the Bulldogs, and played one season with the team before they moved and became the professional Tigers. McCarthy played an additional season there before joining the Saskatoon/Moose Jaw Crescents of the Western Canada Hockey League, and played one final season with the Seattle Metropolitans of the Pacific Coast Hockey Association before retiring in 1923.

Playing career
He played one season for the Quebec Bulldogs (1919–20) and one for the Hamilton Tigers (1920–21) of the NHL and one season for the Seattle Metropolitans (1922–23) of the PCHA. In 35 NHL games, he scored 22 goals and added 7 assists for 29 points. In 16 PCHA games, he scored two goals and one assist.

Career statistics

Regular season and playoffs

References

External links

1893 births
1959 deaths
Canadian ice hockey right wingers
Hamilton Tigers (ice hockey) players
Ice hockey people from Nova Scotia
People from Richmond County, Nova Scotia
Quebec Bulldogs players
Saskatoon Sheiks players
Seattle Metropolitans players